The Elisha Knight (formerly erroneously Wright) Homestead is a historic house at 170 Franklin Street in Stoneham, Massachusetts.  Built c. 1750, it is the only property of that period in Stoneham that retains a rural setting.  The two-story wood-frame house has relatively modest decorations; its decorated entry hood dates to a c. 1870 renovation that probably also removed a central chimney, replacing it with one at the east end.

The house was listed on the National Register of Historic Places in 1984 as the "Elisha Wright Homestead"; a name correction to "Elisha Knight Homestead" was recorded by the state in 2011.

See also
National Register of Historic Places listings in Stoneham, Massachusetts
National Register of Historic Places listings in Middlesex County, Massachusetts

References

Houses in Stoneham, Massachusetts
Houses on the National Register of Historic Places in Stoneham, Massachusetts
Houses completed in 1750